Bileh Hu may refer to:
Bileh Hu-ye Olya
Bileh Hu-ye Sofla